Jack Cosgrove may refer to:
 Jack Cosgrove (American football) (born 1956), American college football coach
 Jack Cosgrove (Gaelic footballer) (born 1949), Irish former sportsperson
 Jack Cosgrove (rugby union) (born 1994), Scottish rugby union player
 Jack Cosgrove (special effects artist) (1902–1965), American special effects artist

See also
 John Cosgrove (disambiguation)